Isa Bazar (also Romanized as ʿĪsá Bāzār and Eesábāzār) is a village in Polan Rural District, Polan District, Chabahar County, Sistan and Baluchestan Province, Iran. At the 2006 census, its population was 108, in 19 families.

References 

Populated places in Chabahar County